Sindoor is a 1987 Indian Hindi-language drama film, produced by A. Krishnamurthy under the Tinu International Films banner, directed by K. Ravi Shankar. It stars Shashi Kapoor, Jaya Prada, Govinda and Neelam Kothari in leading roles, Kader Khan, Shakti Kapoor, Gulshan Grover, Asrani and Aruna Irani in supporting roles and also featuring special appearances by Jeetendra and Rishi Kapoor. The music is composed by Laxmikant–Pyarelal. The film was a remake of Tamil film Unnai Naan Santhithen (1984). The film was remade as Sumangali (1989) in Telugu, starring Krishnam Raju, Jaya Prada .

Plot
The film opens with widowed Laxmi, a loving and caring mother to Lalita, a young college-going, devoted daughter. Ravi is a fellow collegian and a brilliant student. Gulshan Grover also is a student of the same college. Vijay Choudhury joins the college as English Professor. He shares a good rapport with the students. After a few misunderstandings, Lalita and Ravi fall in love. In a college function, Lalita sings the song "Patjhad Saawan Basant Bahaar", where she forgets the lyrics and the song is completed by Professor Vijay Choudhury. Upon asking how he knew the song, he replies that this was a very famous song and his wife's favourite. Lalita tells him she learned the song from her mother.

At his home, he remembers his wife and here the movie goes into a flashback. Vijay and Laxmi are a happily married couple. Vijay is a professor, whereas Laxmi is a singing partner to Kumar. They make a hit singing pair. This leads to a budding misconception between Vijay and Laxmi. Vijay forces Laxmi to leave the home. That very day, Vijay learns that Kumar is getting married and his misconceptions are cleared, but Laxmi is nowhere to be traced.

The movie comes back to the present. Laxmi knew about Lalita and Ravi's love and she meets Advocate Dharamdas, Ravi's maternal uncle and guardian, fixes their marriage, with a condition to pass the final year exams with good numbers. Lalita asks Vijay for home tuition. On visiting Lalita's home, Vijay sees Laxmi in widow's attire; completely shocked (again having misconceptions) he resigns from the college. Lalita informs Laxmi about this. Laxmi meets Vijay at his residence, and tells him the story about her new avatar.

Again a flashback. After leaving his home, Laxmi came to Pune to meet her friend Sunita, the only photograph is shown in the movie). On the way, she saves a little girl named Lalita from an accident. Prem Kapoor is the girl's father. He thanks Laxmi and wants to drive her home. Here, she tells him about her friend Sunita. Prem informs her that he is Sunita's husband and about her death, shows her Sunita's photograph in his room with a garland over it signifying her death. He requests Laxmi to stay at least for a day as its Lalita's birthday the next day and act like her mother as Lalita is a heart patient and she doesn't know about her mother's death. To which she initially disagrees, but finally acts like her mother. On the night of her birthday, Lalita is kidnapped by Shera, Prem's stepbrother. He asks for all of Prem's properties as a ransom.  Prem agrees, but is stabbed by Shera while saving Lalita. Shera is imprisoned. While taking his last breaths, he requests that Laxmi take care of and bring up Lalita as her own child. To spare Lalita from any shock and not letting her know that she isn't her mother, Laxmi acquires widow's getup. The story is again back to the present. Vijay apologizes to Laxmi for misunderstanding her twice.

He rescinds his resignation and starts giving Lalita and Ravi home tuition at Lalita's place. Shera is back from jail and finds the whereabouts of Prem's family. Vijay and Laxmi started meeting each other, which once Ravi saw and informs Lalita about the affair between her mother and Professor Vijay. Which Lalita disbelieves and they have a breakup. Ravi confronts Vijay and warns him to leave the city. Shera takes advantage of the situation and beats Vijay up telling him Ravi is responsible for this. Laxmi knowing about Vijay's condition meets him. Lalita is shocked after she saw her mother hugging professor Vijay. She tries to commit suicide and is saved by Ravi. She decides to leave her home with her father's photograph. Laxmi tries to stop her, but she leaves. Vijay meets Advocate Dharamdas and tells him all the story so as to reconcile the family. Ravi is furious seeing Vijay at his home and insults him. Dharamdas stops him and tells the story to Ravi. Lalita is again kidnapped by Shera. He again asks the same ransom what he asked 14 years back, to which Laxmi agrees. Laxmi goes to meet Shera with the agreed ransom. Then a good fight scene at the climax. Gulshan Grover (Shera's nephew, also a bad guy) is killed by Shera. Shera shoots at Lalita. To save Lalita, Laxmi takes the bullet, is unconscious and Professor Vijay held her. Her Mangalsutra, which she always hides, is out. Another misunderstanding and Lalita is all tears, ready to leave the scene. Shera succumbs to the stabbing earlier in the climax by Gulshan Grover. Police arrive. Lalita is stopped by Ravi. Advocate Dharamdas tells Laxmi's story to Lalita. Lalita realizes her mistake ask for forgiveness from Laxmi. All reconcile.

Cast

 Shashi Kapoor as Professor Vijay Choudhary
 Jaya Prada as Laxmi Choudhary
 Govinda as Ravi Khanna
 Neelam as Lalita Kapoor
 Jeetendra  as Prem Kapoor (special appearance) 
Moushmi Chatterjee as Sunita Kapoor,Only Photo in Photo frame,  (Cameo Role)
 Rishi Kapoor as Kumar (special appearance) 
 Kader Khan  as Advocate Dharamdas
 Shakti Kapoor as Shera, Step brother of Prem Kapoor
 Gulshan Grover as Nishant
 Asrani as Chunnilal ,Tea Seller
 Aruna Irani as Ram Katori , Dharamdas Maid
Prem Chopra as Heeralal/Pannalal (Dual Role)
A. K. Hangal as Temple Priest
Ramesh Deo as Judge
Vikas Anand as Doctor 
Baby Guddu as Child Lalita

Box office
This film was multi starrer and received positive reviews from audience. The film collect ₹8.95 crore and declared a Super Hit by Box Office India.

Soundtrack

References

External links

1980s Hindi-language films
1987 films
Indian drama films
Films scored by Laxmikant–Pyarelal
Hindi remakes of Tamil films
Films directed by K. Ravi Shankar
1987 drama films
Hindi-language drama films